Angela Maurer (born 27 July 1975) is a German long-distance swimmer.

Career
Angela Maurer lives in Wiesbaden, where she was born. She swims for the SSV Undine 08 e.V. Mainz swimming club, and trains together with Dimitri Colupaev and Marc-Oliver Stein under Nikolai Evseev in Mainz.

She has been studying at police technical college since 1 September 2007, and is a member of the Rhineland-Palatinate's state elite sports training programme. At the 2008 Summer Olympics in Beijing she achieved 4th place in the 10 km marathon swim, only a fraction of a second behind the bronze medallist Cassie Patten.

In 2009, she won the 10 km open-water race at the German national swimming championships in Lindau with a time of 2:01:31.43, ensuring her place at the 2009 World Aquatics Championships in Rome.

Achievements
 Qualifying for the 2008 Olympics at the 5th World Open Water Championships in Seville
 8 German national titles in 5 km, 10 km und 25 km open-water swimming
 double 2006 European champion in both 10 km und 25 km open-water swimming, runner-up in 1999 and 2002
 seven World Championship medals in 10 km und 25 km open-water swimming (one gold, three silver, three bronze)
 Overall winner of the 2002 World Cup in open-water swimming
 Hesse Sportswoman of the Year
 Member of the International Marathon Swimming Hall of Fame

References

External links
  
 Angela Maurer at openwaterpedia.com
 Final 2011 World Cup Rankings at dailynewsofopenwaterswimming.com
 
 
 
 

1975 births
Living people
German female swimmers
German female freestyle swimmers
German female long-distance swimmers
Sportspeople from Wiesbaden
Swimmers at the 2008 Summer Olympics
Swimmers at the 2012 Summer Olympics
Olympic swimmers of Germany
World Aquatics Championships medalists in open water swimming
20th-century German women
21st-century German women